Simón Steven Almeida Trinidad (born January 26, 1995) is a Mexican professional footballer who currently plays for A.C. Barnechea.

Career

Pachuca
Almeida joined Pachuca's youth academy in 2010. He made his official debut with the senior team at 16 years old in a Liga MX match against San Luis on 24 September 2011, coming on as an 85' minute substitute for Mauro Cejas at the Estadio Hidalgo. At the start of the 2015 Apertura tournament, it was announced that Almeida would go out on loan to León. After not making a single Liga MX appearance with León, Almeida returned to Pachuca for the 2016 Clausura tournament. Almeida scored his first Liga MX goal with Pachuca in the 90'+4 minute of a 5–2 home victory over Puebla after coming on as a substitute at the 90'+1 minute on February 14, 2016.

Career statistics

Club

Honours
Pachuca
 Liga MX: Clausura 2016

References

External links
 
 

1995 births
Living people
Mexican footballers
Mexican expatriate footballers
Association football wingers
Footballers from Veracruz
People from Alvarado, Veracruz
C.F. Pachuca players
Club León footballers
Everton de Viña del Mar footballers
Mineros de Zacatecas players
Cafetaleros de Chiapas footballers
A.C. Barnechea footballers
Liga MX players
Ascenso MX players
Liga Premier de México players
Chilean Primera División players
Expatriate footballers in Chile
Mexican expatriate sportspeople in Chile